Lambda (uppercase , lowercase ; , lám(b)da) is the 11th letter of the Greek alphabet, representing the voiced alveolar lateral approximant . In the system of Greek numerals, lambda has a value of 30. Lambda is derived from the Phoenician Lamed . Lambda gave rise to the Latin L and the Cyrillic El (Л). In Modern Greek, the name of the letter, Λάμδα, is pronounced .

In early Greek alphabets, the shape and orientation of lambda varied. Most variants consisted of two straight strokes, one longer than the other, connected at their ends. The angle might be in the upper-left, lower-left ("Western" alphabets) or top ("Eastern" alphabets). Other variants had a vertical line with a horizontal or sloped stroke running to the right. With the general adoption of the Ionic alphabet, Greek settled on an angle at the top; the Romans put the angle at the lower-left.

The HTML 4 character entity references for the Greek capital and small letter lambda are &#923; and &#955; respectively. The Unicode code points for lambda are U+039B and U+03BB.

Symbol

Upper-case letter Λ

Examples of the symbolic use of uppercase lambda include:
 The lambda particle is a type of subatomic particle in subatomic particle physics.
 Lambda is the set of logical axioms in the axiomatic method of logical deduction in first-order logic.
 There is a poetical allusion to the use of Lambda as a shield blazon by the Spartans.
 Lambda is the von Mangoldt function in mathematical number theory.
 Lambda denotes the de Bruijn–Newman constant which is closely connected with Riemann's hypothesis.
 In statistics, lambda is used for the likelihood ratio.
 In statistics, Wilks's lambda is used in multivariate analysis of variance (MANOVA analysis) to compare group means on a combination of dependent variables.
 In the spectral decomposition of matrices, lambda indicates the diagonal matrix of the eigenvalues of the matrix.
 In computer science, lambda is the time window over which a process is observed for determining the working memory set for a digital computer's virtual memory management.
 In astrophysics, lambda represents the likelihood that a small body will encounter a planet or a dwarf planet leading to a deflection of a significant magnitude. An object with a large value of lambda is expected to have cleared its neighbourhood, satisfying the current definition of a planet.
 In crystal optics, lambda is used to represent a lattice period.
 In NATO military operations, a chevron (a heraldic symbol which looks like a capital letter lambda or inverted V) is painted on the vehicles of this military alliance for identification.
 In electrochemistry, lambda denotes the "equivalent conductance" of an electrolyte solution.
 In cosmology, lambda is the symbol for the cosmological constant, a term added to some dynamical equations to account for the accelerating expansion of the universe.
 In optics, lambda denotes the grating pitch of a Bragg reflector. Also in optics, it denotes wavelength of light.
 In politics, the lambda is the symbol of Identitarianism, a white nationalist movement that originated in France before spreading out to the rest of Europe and later on to North America, Australia and New Zealand. The Identitarian lambda represents the Battle of Thermopylae.

Lower-case letter λ

Examples of the symbolic use of lowercase lambda include:
 Lambda indicates the wavelength of any wave, especially in physics, electronic engineering, and mathematics.
 In evolutionary algorithms, λ indicates the number of offspring that would be generated from μ current population in each generation. The terms μ and λ are originated from Evolution strategy notation.
 Lambda indicates the radioactivity decay constant in nuclear physics and radioactivity. This constant is very simply related (by a multiplicative constant) to the half-life of any radioactive material.
 In probability theory, lambda represents the density of occurrences within a time interval, as modelled by the Poisson distribution.
 In mathematical logic and computer science, lambda is used to introduce anonymous functions expressed with the concepts of lambda calculus.
 Lambda indicates an eigenvalue in the mathematics of linear algebra.
 In the physics of electric fields, lambda sometimes indicates the linear charge density of a uniform line of electric charge (measured in coulombs per meter).
 Lambda denotes a Lagrange multiplier in multi-dimensional calculus.
 In solid-state electronics, lambda indicates the channel length modulation parameter of a MOSFET.
 In ecology, lambda denotes the long-term intrinsic growth rate of a population. This value is often calculated as the dominant eigenvalue of the age/size class matrix.
 In formal language theory and in computer science, lambda denotes the empty string.
 Lambda is a nonstandard symbol in the International Phonetic Alphabet for the voiced alveolar lateral affricate .
 Lambda denotes the Lebesgue measure in mathematical set theory.
 The Goodman and Kruskal's lambda in statistics indicates the proportional reduction in error when one variable's values are used to predict the values of another variable.
 Lambda denotes the oxygen sensor in a vehicle that measures the air-to-fuel ratio in the exhaust gases of an internal-combustion engine.
 A Lambda 4S solid-fuel rocket was used to launch Japan's first orbital satellite in 1970.
 Lambda denotes the failure rate of devices and systems in reliability theory, and it is measured in failure events per hour. Numerically, this lambda is also the reciprocal of the mean time between failures.
 In criminology, lambda denotes an individual's frequency of offences.
 In electrochemistry, lambda also denotes the ionic conductance of a given ion (the composition of the ion is generally shown as a subscript to the lambda character).
 In neurobiology, lambda denotes the length constant (or exponential rate of decay) of the electric potential across the cell membrane along a length of a nerve cell's axon.
 In the science and technology of heat transfer, lambda denotes the heat of vaporization per mole of material (a.k.a. its "latent heat").
 In the technology and science of celestial navigation, lambda denotes the longitude as opposed to the Roman letter "L", which denotes the latitude.
 A block style lambda is used as a recurring symbol in the Valve computer game series Half-Life, referring to the Lambda Complex of the fictional Black Mesa Research Facility, as well as making appearances in the sequel Half-Life 2, and its subsequent prequel Half-Life: Alyx as an in universe symbol of resistance.
 In 1970, a lowercase lambda was chosen by Tom Doerr as the symbol of the New York chapter of the Gay Activists Alliance. The lambda symbol became associated with Gay Liberation and recognized as an LGBT symbol for some time afterwards, being used as such by the International Gay Rights Congress in Edinburgh.

Litra symbol
The Roman libra and Byzantine lítra, which served as both the pound mass unit and liter volume unit, were abbreviated in Greek using lambda with modified forms of the iota subscript (as λͅ). These are variously encoded in Unicode. The Ancient Greek Numbers Unicode block includes 10183  (𐆃) as well as 𐅢, which is described as 10162  but was much more common as a form of the litra sign. A variant of the sign can be formed from 0338  and either 039B  (Λ̸) or 03BB  (λ̸).

Character encodings
Unicode uses the (Modern Greek-based) spelling "lamda" in character names, instead of "lambda", due to "the pre-existing names in ISO 8859-7, as well as preferences expressed by the Greek National Body".

 Greek Lambda / Coptic Laula

 Mathematical Lambda

These characters are used only as mathematical symbols. Stylized Greek text should be encoded using the normal Greek letters, with markup and formatting to indicate text style.

See also 

 Barred lambda - ƛ
 El (Cyrillic) – Л, л
 Fraser alphabet#Consonants
 Greek letters used in mathematics, science, and engineering

References

Greek letters
LGBT symbols